Ammonium metavanadate is the inorganic compound with the formula NH4VO3.  It is a white salt, although samples are often yellow owing to impurities of V2O5.  It is an important intermediate in the purification of vanadium.

Synthesis and structure
The compound is prepared by the addition of ammonium salts to solutions of vanadate ions, generated by dissolution of V2O5 in basic aqueous solutions, such as hot sodium carbonate.  The compound precipitates as a colourless solid. This precipitation step can be slow.

The compound adopts a polymeric structure consisting of chains of [VO3]−, formed as corner-sharing VO4 tetrahedra.  These chains are  interconnected via hydrogen bonds with ammonium ions.

Uses
Vanadium is often purified from aqueous extracts of slags and ore by selective precipitation of ammonium metavanadate.  The material is then roasted to give vanadium pentoxide:
2 NH4VO3   →   V2O5  +  2 NH3  +  H2O

Other
Vanadates can behave as structural mimics of phosphates, and in this way they exhibit biological activity.

Ammonium metavanadate is used to prepare Mandelin reagent, a qualitative test for alkaloids.

References

Vanadates
Ammonium compounds
Inorganic compounds